Tristan Gabriel Pompey (born March 23, 1997) is a Canadian professional baseball outfielder for the Guelph Royals of the Intercounty Baseball League. The Miami Marlins selected him in the third round of the 2018 Major League Baseball draft after his college baseball career for the Kentucky Wildcats.

Career

Amateur career
Pompey played in the Tournament 12 showcase and for the Canadian national junior baseball team. He attended Jean Vanier Catholic Secondary School in Milton, Ontario, graduating in 2015, and committed to attend the University of Kentucky to play college baseball for the Kentucky Wildcats. The Minnesota Twins selected Pompey in the 31st round of the 2015 MLB draft, but he didn't sign. He enrolled at Kentucky. He was named All-Southeastern Conference in 2017, his sophomore year, and a Preseason All-American by Collegiate Baseball and Perfect Game in 2018. In 2017, he played collegiate summer baseball with the Wareham Gatemen of the Cape Cod Baseball League. He batted .335 in 2018, his junior year.

Miami Marlins
The Marlins selected Pompey in the third round, with the 89th overall selection, of the 2018 Major League Baseball draft. He signed with the Marlins, receiving a $645,000 signing bonus. The Marlins assigned him to the Gulf Coast League Marlins before promoting him to the Greensboro Grasshoppers of the Single-A South Atlantic League. After playing 24 games for Greensboro, the Marlins promoted Pompey to the Jupiter Hammerheads of the High-A Florida State League. In 52 total games between the two clubs, Pompey slashed .299/.408/.397 with three home runs, 23 RBIs, and ten stolen bases.

Pompey spent the 2019 season with Jupiter, batting .194 with 13 RBIs over 42 games. He did not play in a game in 2020 due to the cancellation of the minor league season because of the COVID-19 pandemic. In 2021, Pompey split the year between the Double-A Pensacola Blue Wahoos and Triple-A Jacksonville Jumbo Shrimp, hitting a combined .195/.314/.262 with one home run and 16 RBI in 56 total games.

On February 5, 2022, Pompey was suspended for 50 games for his second positive test for a "drug of abuse". The Marlins released Pompey on June 14.

Winnipeg Goldeyes
On June 21, 2022, Pompey signed with the Winnipeg Goldeyes of the American Association of Professional Baseball. He played in only 7 games for Winnipeg, hitting .318/.444/.364 with no home runs or RBI.

Québec Capitales
On July 5, 2022, Pompey was traded to the Québec Capitales of the Frontier League for a player to be named later. Pompey played in 46 games for Québec, batting .215/.356/.361 with 4 home runs and 13 RBI. On December 5, 2022, Pompey was released by the Capitales by having his contract option declined.

Guelph Royals
On March 6, 2023, Pompey signed with the Guelph Royals of the Intercounty Baseball League.

International career
He was selected Canada national baseball team at the 2017 U-18 Baseball World Cup, 2019 Pan American Games Qualifier. 2019 Pan American Games and 2019 WBSC Premier12.

Personal life
Pompey's older brother is Dalton Pompey.

References

External links

1997 births
Living people
Baseball outfielders
Baseball people from British Columbia
Baseball players at the 2019 Pan American Games
Black Canadian baseball players
Canada national baseball team players
Canadian expatriate baseball players in the United States
Greensboro Grasshoppers players
Gulf Coast Marlins players
Jupiter Hammerheads players
Kentucky Wildcats baseball players
Pan American Games medalists in baseball
Pan American Games silver medalists for Canada
Sportspeople from New Westminster
Wareham Gatemen players
2019 WBSC Premier12 players
Medalists at the 2019 Pan American Games